Bryne Station is a railway station in the town of Bryne in Rogaland county, Norway. The station is located along the Sørlandet Line and it is served by the Jæren Commuter Rail between Stavanger and Egersund as well as regional trains between Stavanger and Kristiansand. The station has a staffed ticket window during weekdays. It also has vending machines for food and drink.

History
The station was first opened in 1878 as Thime station.  Around the year 1883, the spelling was changed to Time.  On 1 February 1921, the station was renamed Bryne station.

References

Railway stations on the Sørlandet Line
Railway stations in Rogaland
Railway stations opened in 1878
1878 establishments in Norway
Time, Norway